This is a complete list of four-star generals in the United States Air Force. The rank of general (or full general, or four-star general) is the highest rank normally achievable in the U.S. Air Force. It ranks above lieutenant general (three-star general) and below General of the Air Force (five-star general).

There have been 230 four-star generals in the history of the U.S. Air Force. Of these, 226 achieved that rank while on active duty, 3 were promoted after retirement, and one was promoted posthumously. Generals entered the Air Force via several paths: 60 were commissioned via the U.S. Military Academy (USMA), 49 via the aviation cadet program, 45 via the U.S. Air Force Academy (USAFA), 42 via Air Force Reserve Officer Training Corps (AFROTC) at a civilian university, 13 via AFROTC at a senior military college, 9 via Air Force Officer Training School (OTS), 4 via the U.S. Naval Academy (USNA), 4 via Reserve Officer Training Corps (ROTC) at a civilian university, 2 via direct commission (direct), one via direct commission inter-service transfer from the Army National Guard (ARNG), and one via direct commission inter-service transfer from the Royal Canadian Air Force (RCAF).

List of generals
Entries in the following list of four-star generals are indexed by the numerical order in which each officer was promoted to that rank while on active duty, or by an asterisk (*) if the officer did not serve in that rank while on active duty. Each entry lists the general's name, date of rank, active-duty positions held while serving at four-star rank, number of years of active-duty service at four-star rank (Yrs), year commissioned and source of commission, number of years in commission when promoted to four-star rank (YC), and other biographical notes (years of birth and death are shown in parentheses in the Notes column).

History

Four-star positions

1943–1991

The modern rank of general was established by the Officer Personnel Act of 1947, which authorized the President to designate certain positions of importance to carry that rank. Officers appointed to such positions bear temporary four-star rank while so serving, and are allowed to retire at that rank if their performance is judged satisfactory. The total number of active-duty four-star generals in the Air Force is limited to a fixed percentage of the number of Air Force general officers serving at all ranks.

Within the Air Force, the chief of staff (CSAF) and vice chief of staff (VCSAF) are four-star generals by statute. Other four-star generals occupy positions of designated importance; historically, these have included the commanders responsible for strategic bombers and nuclear missiles (SAC/STRATCOM); tactical air combat (TAC/ACC); air transport (MAC/TRANSCOM); North American aerospace defense (NORAD); the Air Force formations in Europe and the Pacific; and other training, readiness, and materiel organizations.

The Air Force also competes with the other services for a number of joint four-star positions, such as the chairman (CJCS) and vice chairman (VJCS) of the Joint Chiefs of Staff. Other joint four-star positions have included unified combatant commanders and certain NATO staff positions.

1991–present

See also
General (United States)
List of active duty United States four-star officers
List of United States Army four-star generals
List of United States Coast Guard four-star admirals
List of United States Marine Corps four-star generals
List of United States Navy four-star admirals
List of United States Space Force four-star generals
List of United States Public Health Service Commissioned Corps four-star admirals
List of United States military leaders by rank
List of Royal Air Force air chief marshals
List of lieutenant generals in the United States Air Force before 1960
List of United States Air Force lieutenant generals from 2000 to 2009
List of United States Air Force lieutenant generals from 2010 to 2019
List of United States Air Force lieutenant generals since 2020

References

Bibliography 

Air Force Four-Star Generals
Lists of generals
Four-star generals
 
Four-star officers